IIII may refer to:

IIII, a representation of the Roman numeral 4, seen on clock faces
IIII (album), a 2021 album by Robin Schulz